Jean-Baptiste van Loo (14 January 1684 – 19 December 1745) was a French subject and portrait painter.

Life and career
He was born in Aix-en-Provence, and was instructed in art by his father Louis-Abraham van Loo, son of Jacob van Loo. Having at an early age executed several pictures for the decoration of the church and public buildings at Aix, he was employed on similar work at Toulon, which he was obliged to leave during the siege of 1707.

He was patronized by the prince of Carignan, who sent him to Rome, where he studied under Benedetto Luti. He was much employed painting for churches in Rome, and in particular executed a greatly praised Scourging of Christ for the church of Santa Maria in Monticelli. At Turin he painted Charles Emmanuel II, Duke of Savoy and several members of his court. Then, moving to Paris, where he was elected a member of the Académie Royale de Peinture et de Sculpture, he executed various altar-pieces and restored the works of Francesco Primaticcio at Fontainebleau. He also painted portraits of aristocrats living in or visiting Paris, including a young William Murray who later went on to be a friend and regular client as the 1st Lord Mansfield.

In 1737 he went to England, where he attracted attention by his portrait of Colley Cibber and of Owen McSwiny, the theatrical manager; the latter, like many other of van Loo's works, was engraved in mezzotint by John Faber the Younger. He also painted Sir Robert Walpole, whose portrait by van Loo in his robes as chancellor of the exchequer is in the National Portrait Gallery, London, and the prince and princess of Wales. He did not, however, practise long in England, because of his failing health; he retired to Paris in 1742, and afterwards to Aix-en-Provence, where he died on 19 December 1745. His likenesses were striking and faithful, but seldom flattering, and his heads are forcible in coloring.

Selected works

See also
 His younger brother, Charles-André van Loo (1705–1765), was also a painter.
 Two of his sons were notable painters, Louis-Michel van Loo (1707–1771) and Charles-Amédée-Philippe van Loo (1719–1795).
 John Giles Eccardt, one of his apprentices, also became a noted portrait painter in Britain.

References

External links

1684 births
1745 deaths
People from Aix-en-Provence
18th-century French painters
French male painters
Rococo painters
18th-century French male artists